Ana Roca (born 16 October 1982 in Šibenik, SFR Yugoslavia) is a Croatian female professional basketball player.

References

External links
Profile at eurobasket.com
Profile at fibaeurope.com

1982 births
Living people
Basketball players from Šibenik
Croatian women's basketball players
Croatian Women's Basketball League players
Mediterranean Games medalists in basketball
Mediterranean Games silver medalists for Croatia
Competitors at the 2005 Mediterranean Games
Forwards (basketball)